Bassin Bleu (Blue Basin) is a natural water site located  northwest of the city of Jacmel, in the Sud-Est department of Haiti. It is a series of three pools along the Petite Rivière de Jacmel.

Access
To access the site, you need to go in the direction of La Vallée-de-Jacmel, and then Bassin-Bleu. From the village of Bassin-Bleu, the road to the site is up.

Access is not very difficult with a four-wheel drive vehicle. It is a winding road in the mountains allowing access to the site. Getting into the best open part and for diving from several levels requires about a 20-minute hike, then roping down a  rock face. Locals are often present for guidance and steadying. As of 2018, each visitor pays an admission fee of 100HTG at the tourism office, then one can walk there independently or hire a local guide for a fee (about 100HTG per person). Additionally there is a 100HTG parking fee per car.

Pools
The site consists of four pools:
Bassin Palmiste
Bassin Bleu
Bassin Clair
Bassin Cheval

The latter is by far the most well-known with a cascade of  falling into a pool of turquoise water. The mineral-rich waters can turn muddy brown after heavy rainfall.

References

Geography of Haiti
Jacmel
Lakes of Haiti

Waterfalls of Haiti